Justin Hughes is the William H. Hannon Professor of Law at Loyola Law School, Los Angeles, where he teaches courses in intellectual property law, international trade, and internet law. As a scholar he has emphasized philosophical and historical issues in intellectual property, focusing on copyright, trademarks, and geographical indications. He led United States delegations to international negotiations on copyright.

Biography
After obtaining his Juris Doctor degree from Harvard University in 1986, Hughes spent time as a Luce Scholar, clerking for the Lord President of the Supreme Court of Malaysia [1988-89] then worked on policy at the U.S. Patent and Trademark Office (USPTO) [1997-2001]. He taught at the Benjamin N. Cardozo School of Law from 2002 through 2013.

In 2009, the Obama administration tapped him to become a part-time adviser.  In that position, he began heading US delegations to meetings of the World Intellectual Property Organization (WIPO). At a December 2009 meeting of the WIPO, he announced a significant shift in US policy in international copyright law that resulted in Brazil, Mexico, the US and European Union leading efforts to establish exceptions in international copyright law for the blind. Along with delegates from India and Mexico, he also successfully resuscitated efforts to finish the long dormant WIPO Audiovisual Performers Treaty. Hughes led the US delegations that completed both that treaty, now frequently called the Beijing Treaty on Audiovisual Performances (2012) and the Marrakesh Treaty for the Blind (2013). He is widely credited with having been instrumental in the negotiation of both multilateral treaties.

References

External links
 JustinHughes.net
 Loyola Law School Faculty, Justin Hughes
 2009 Statement on behalf of the United States on Copyright Exceptions and Limitations for Persons with Print Disabilities
 2006 Testimony before US-China Economic and Security Review Commission
 Testimony before Senate Judiciary Committee (p.28)

American legal scholars
Cardozo School of Law faculty
Harvard Law School alumni
Living people
Loyola Law School faculty
Year of birth missing (living people)